Isthmiophora is a genus of flatworms belonging to the family Echinostomatidae.

The species of this genus are found in Europe.

Species:
 Isthmiophora melis (Schrank, 1788) 
 Isthmiophora scapteromae Sutton, 1983

References

Platyhelminthes